Professor Carlos Caldas  is a clinician scientist and Senior Group Leader at the Cancer Research UK Cambridge Institute, University of Cambridge. He is the Chair of Cancer Medicine at the University of Cambridge, an Honorary Consultant Medical Oncologist at Addenbrooke's Hospital and Director of the Cambridge Breast Cancer Research Unit. He is a fellow of Robinson College, Cambridge and an Emeritus Senior Investigator at the National Institute for Health Research (NIHR).

Education 

Professor Carlos Caldas graduated from the University of Lisbon Medical School before training in Internal Medicine in University of Texas Southwestern, Dallas and Medical Oncology at Johns Hopkins Hospital, Baltimore. He then moved to the Institute of Cancer Research, London to complete a research fellowship.

Research and career 

Caldas' research focuses on the functional genomics of breast cancer. Caldas led the METABRIC (Molecular Taxonomy of Breast Cancer International Consortium) study, analysing the genome and transcriptome of tumours from nearly 2,000 women and comparing this with long-term clinical information including survival, age and diagnosis. The METABRIC study concluded that breast cancer was at least ten different subtypes, characterised by distinct genomic drivers. In 2019, the team published research showing the subtype a women's breast cancer is initially placed in could predict the likelihood of the tumour returning or metastasising over the next 20 years.

Professor Caldas leads the Personalised Breast Cancer Programme in Cambridge, where woman diagnosed with breast cancer have a sample of their tumour and blood sent for DNA and RNA sequencing. The sequencing results help determine the best course of treatment for patients and can reveal if their tumour is developing resistance to treatment.

Awards and honours 

 Academy of Medical Sciences Fellow, 2004
 European Academy of Cancer Sciences Fellow, 2010
 EMBO member, 2015
 European Society for Medical Oncology Hamilton Fairley Award, 2016
 European Society of Human Genetics ESHG Award Laureate, 2021

References 

Living people
British oncologists
Fellows of the Academy of Medical Sciences (United Kingdom)
Members of the European Molecular Biology Organization
Fellows of Robinson College, Cambridge
1960 births
NIHR Senior Investigators